The Thomson EF936x series is a type of Graphic Display Processor (GDP) by Thomson-EFCIS. The chip could draw at 1 million pixels per second, which was relatively advanced for the time of its release (1982 or earlier). There are various versions of the chip (EF9364, EF9365, EF9366, EF9367, SFF96364, EF9369), with slightly different capabilities.

In 1982 Commodore released a "High Resolution Graphics" board for the PET based on the EF9365 and EF9366 chips, allowing it to display 512 x 512 or 512 x 256 resolution graphics. The EF9366 was also used on the SMP-E353 graphic card for the Siemens  computer series and on the NDR-Klein-Computer introduced in 1984.

Version EF9369 was used on computers such as the Thomson MO5NR, Thomson MO6, Thomson TO8, Thomson TO9 and Thomson TO9+, from 1985 to 1989.

Versions
Based on the 1989 data book published by the company, the EF936x series was split into Graphics Controllers and Color Palette models.

Graphics Controllers
EF9364 CRT Processor introduced in 1981
EF9365 512×512 (interlaced), 256×256, 128×128, 64×64; 50 Hz
EF9366 512×256 (noninterlaced); 50/60 Hz
EF9367 1024×512 (interlaced), 1024x416 (interlaced); 50/60 Hz (capable of SECAM system output for the French market).
SFF96364

Color Palette
EF9369 - 4-bit DACs (16 out of 4096 colors - 12-bit RGB), generating gamma corrected (gamma 2.8) voltages.
TS9370 - 4-bit DACs (16 out of 4096 colors)

Capabilities
Integrated DRAM controller
Line drawing, with delta-x and delta-y limited to 255 each. Support for solid, dotted, dashed and dotted/dashed lines.
Built-in 5×8 pixel ASCII font. Support for rendering tilted characters, and scaling by integer factors (no antialiasing)

Clear screen
Light Pen support

The GPUs did not support direct access to the graphics memory, although a special command was provided to aid in implementing access to individual memory words.

See also
Thomson EF934x
Thomson MO5NR
Thomson MO6
Thomson TO8
Thomson TO9
Thomson TO9+
NDR-Klein-Computer
Commodore PET
List of home computers by video hardware

References

External links
 Full schematics
 PCB

Graphics chips
Thomson computers